Maximiano Valdés (born June 19, 1949) is a Chilean classical musician and orchestral conductor. He is the music director of the Puerto Rico Symphony Orchestra.

Biography
Valdés was born in Santiago, Chile in 1949. His parents were the composer Sylvia Soublette and Gabriel Valdés, who was Chile’s Minister of Foreign Affairs from 1964 to 1970. Immediately after Valdés graduated from the Academy of St. Cecilia in 1976 he was signed by La Fenice as assistant conductor, and the following year he joined the Tanglewood Festival with the same role. After winning the Malko and Vittorio Gui competitions in 1980 he got his first principal position in the Paris Opera, which eventually led to performance in other theaters.

However he remained tied to the Paris Opera, and his operatic duties led him to resign from the Euskadi Symphony. In his departing announcement he was critical with the lack of a single seat back then and instead perform in different Basque towns, and the "lack of clear ideas to propose an orchestral model", he resigned in August 1986.

The following year he was invited by the Buffalo Philharmonic's principal conductor Semyon Bychkov, who was looking for his successor. Valdés made his American debut in October 1987; in 1989, he was appointed Music Director of that orchestra, a position he held until 1998. During the 07/08 season, Valdés toured with his Asturian orchestra. The orchestra traveled Mexico, Spain and China.

Maximiano Valdés has several recordings available and he signed on with Naxos to record works by Latin American and Spanish composers with the orchestra in Asturias.

Premieres

North American orchestral engagements
 Baltimore Symphony
 Buffalo Philharmonic
 Calgary Philharmonic
 Dallas Symphony
 Edmonton Symphony Orchestra
 Houston Symphony
 Indianapolis Symphony Orchestra
 Louisiana Philharmonic
 Montreal Symphony
 National Arts Centre Orchestra
 National Symphony Orchestra
 New World Symphony (orchestra)
 Phoenix Symphony
 Saint Louis Symphony
 San Diego Symphony
 Seattle Symphony
 Syracuse Symphony Orchestra
 Vancouver Symphony

Other orchestral engagements
 Orquesta Sinfónica Simón Bolívar (1978–1982)
 Dresden Philharmonie
 Russian State Symphony Orchestra
 Sinfonia Varsovia
 Krakow Philharmonic
 Polish National Radio Symphony Orchestra
 Nice Opera Orchestra
 Lisbon Philharmonic
 Malaysian Philharmonic
 Orquesta Sinfonica d'Estado de São Paulo

Summer festival engagements
 Mann Music Center
 Caramoor Festival
 Interlochen Center for the Arts
 Grand Teton Music Festival
 Eastern Music Festival
 Chautauqua Symphony
 Music Academy of the West
 Grant Park Symphony Orchestra

References

American male conductors (music)
Living people
American music educators
Chilean people of Asturian descent
Chilean people of Spanish descent
Chilean conductors (music)
21st-century American conductors (music)
21st-century American male musicians
1949 births